The Military ranks of Guinea-Bissau are the military insignia used by the Military of Guinea-Bissau.

Commissioned officer ranks
The rank insignia of commissioned officers.

Other ranks
The rank insignia of non-commissioned officers and enlisted personnel.

Military branch of the African Party for the Independence of Guinea and Cape Verde (PAIGC)

Commissioned
The rank insignia for commissioned personnel for the former military branch of the African Party for the Independence of Guinea and Cape Verde.

Enlisted
The rank insignia for enlisted personnel for the former military branch of the African Party for the Independence of Guinea and Cape Verde.

References

External links
 

Guinea-Bissau
Military of Guinea-Bissau